The men's normal hill individual ski jumping competition for the 1972 Winter Olympics was held at Miyanomori Ski Jump Stadium. It occurred on 6 February.

Results

References

Ski jumping at the 1972 Winter Olympics